The Fuk Tak Chi Temple or Fook Tet Soo Khek Temple was one of the oldest former temple in Singapore built in 1820 by Cantonese and Hakka immigrants from Kwong Wai Siew (广惠肇三府). It is currently a museum housing more than 200 artefacts.

History 
The temple was built in 1820 by Cantonese and Hakka immigrants to Singapore. In 1825, it was rebuilt using bricks.

Two other Hakka clans, Fong Yun Thai and Ying Fo Fui Kun joined in 1854 after contributing to the temple's rebuilding project. Dedicated to Tua Pek Kong, it is a Chinese folk religion temple which caters to the religious needs of both Chinese folk religionists and Taoists.

The small shrine later also catered to the welfare of the large Chinese community by functioning as an association.

In 1995, the temple was awarded to Far East Organisation, alongside Chui Eng Free School and other shophouses, by the Urban Redevelopment Authority for conservation and reuse purposes.

In August 1998, the building was restored and converted into a museum with artefacts on the lives of early Chinese migrants in Singapore. In 2000, it became part of the new Far East Square development.

In October 2014, the temple closed for renovation for 10 months and reopened in August 2015. Amoy Hotel's entrance is located through the temple as well.

See also
 Religion in Singapore

References

External link
 Infopedia

Chinese-Singaporean culture
Ethnic museums in Singapore
Museums of Chinese culture abroad
Outram, Singapore
Religious buildings and structures completed in 1824
Taoist temples in Singapore
Hakka culture in Singapore
1824 establishments
19th-century architecture in Singapore